Oswald William Thomas Sidwell (16 April 1920 – 19 August 2021) was an Australian tennis player.

Sidwell reached five Grand Slam doubles finals, winning once, at the 1949 U.S. National Championships with compatriot John Bromwich. He also played in the Davis Cup in 1948 and 1949 where Australia lost to the United States both years in the Challenge Round. As a junior, he won the Australian Open boys' singles event in 1939. Sidwell played golf regularly in place of tennis.

He was ranked world No. 10 for 1949 by John Olliff. As of December 2008, Sidwell was still organising golf events at the age of 88. He turned 100 in April 2020 and died in Caringbah in August 2021, at the age of 101.

Grand Slam finals

Doubles (1 title, 4 runners-up)

Mixed doubles (1 runner-up)

References

External links
 
 
 
 AVGA official website

1920 births
2021 deaths
Australian centenarians
Australian Championships (tennis) junior champions
Australian male tennis players
Tennis people from New South Wales
United States National champions (tennis)
Grand Slam (tennis) champions in men's doubles
Grand Slam (tennis) champions in boys' singles
Grand Slam (tennis) champions in boys' doubles
Men centenarians